Mike Cotton may refer to:

 Mike Cotton (musician) (born 1939), English jazz and R&B musician, vocalist and bandleader
 Mike Cotton (pole vaulter) (born 1951), former American college and international track and field athlete

See also
 Mike Cotten (born 1939), former American football player